Shmuel Toledano (16 January 1921 – 30 December 2022) was an Israeli Mossad employee and politician who served as a member of the Knesset for the Democratic Movement for Change and Shinui between 1977 and 1981.

Biography
Born in Tiberias during the Mandate era, Toledano attended the Scottish College in Safed. He joined the Haganah, and was imprisoned by the British authorities in Latrun. From 1949 he served in the Israel Defense Forces, and was demobilised with the rank of major. Between 1953 and 1976 he worked for Mossad, and was one of the organisation's leaders.

Toledano joined Mapai in 1960, but left the party in 1977 to join the newly formed Democratic Movement for Change (Dash). He was elected to the Knesset on the party's list in 1977 and chaired the State Control Committee. When Dash split the following year, he became a member of Shinui. He lost his seat in the 1981 elections, and in 1983 left Shinui to join Mapam. For his efforts for peace he won in 1999 the Mount Zion Award.

Toledano died on 30 December 2022, at the age of 101.

References

External links

 by Leon Charney on The Leon Charney Report

1921 births
2022 deaths
Israeli centenarians
Israeli soldiers
Haganah members
People of the Mossad
People of the Military Intelligence Directorate (Israel)
Mapai politicians
Democratic Movement for Change politicians
Shinui politicians
Mapam politicians
Men centenarians
Israeli people of Moroccan-Jewish descent
Sephardi Jews in Mandatory Palestine
Israeli Sephardi Jews
People from Tiberias
Members of the 9th Knesset (1977–1981)